Thomas Field may refer to:
Thomas Field (Anglican priest, born 1829) (1829–1899), "Canon Field", Anglican priest in South Australia
Thomas Field (Anglican priest, born 1855) (1855–1936), Church of England priest
Thomas Field (Catholic priest) (1546–1625), Irish Jesuit priest and explorer
Thomas Field (politician) (1859–1937), New Zealand politician of the Reform Party
Tom Field (born 1997), Anglo-Irish footballer
Tommy Field (born 1987), American baseball shortstop

See also
Tom Fields (born 1992), Australian rules footballer
Tom Fields (artist) (born 1951), Muscogee Creek/Cherokee photographer from Oklahoma
Thomas C. Fields (1825–1885), New York politician